Betaeus is a genus of shrimp of the family Alpheidae, containing the following species:
Betaeus australis Stimpson, 1860
Betaeus emarginatus (H. Milne-Edwards, 1837)
Betaeus ensenadensis Glassell, 1938
Betaeus gelasinifer Nomura & Komai, 2000
Betaeus gracilis Hart, 1964
Betaeus granulimanus Yokoya, 1927
Betaeus harfordi (Kingsley, 1878)
Betaeus harrimani Rathbun, 1904
Betaeus jucundus Barnard, 1947
Betaeus lilianae Boschi, 1966
Betaeus longidactylus Lockington, 1877
Betaeus macginitieae Hart, 1964
Betaeus pingi Yu, 1930
Betaeus setosus Hart, 1964
Betaeus truncatus Dana, 1852

References

Alpheidae
Decapod genera
Taxa named by James Dwight Dana